Manoj Bakshi  is an Indian actor who acts in films, television and theatre. He is famous for his roles in Bajrangi Bhaijaan (2015), Delhi Belly (2011), Jab Tak Hai Jaan (2012), Gori Tere Pyaar Mein (2013), Junooniyat (2016), Madaari (2016) and Hamari Paltan (2018).  He has also worked in a rustic film Dear Vs Bear and many more with Haryanvi actor Uttar Kumar and Rahul Music Channel.

Early life

Bakshi began his career as a theatre artist in 1980. He has worked in plays in Uttar Pradesh for 18 years. Bakshi has performed key roles in many plays such as Mahabhoj, Chandramukhi, Jis Lahore Nai Vekhya O Jamyai Nai, Curfew, Muawze, Til Ka Taad, Dil Ki Dukaan, Kath Ki Gadi, Baby, Yaaddasht Mubarak, Heroine No.1, Chor Nikal Ke Bhaga, Samaryatra, Is Dard Ki Dawa Kahaan and more.

Career

The Pakistani policeman's role in the superhit movie Bajrangi Bhaijaan with Salman Khan brought him a new identity in the Bollywood industry. Bakshi has worked with seasoned actors like Govinda, Rishi Kapoor, Neetu Singh, Ranbir Kapoor and all the Khans.

He also appeared in the movie Panipat as a very controversial character, Maharaja Surajmal. It was a short role of Hindu Jat ruler of Bharatpur in Rajasthan, India. In the film, Maratha warrior Sadashiv Rao Bhau (a character played by Arjun Kapoor) asks Maharaja Surajmal for help to defeat the Afghans, but he demands the Agra Fort in return. As his demand remained unfulfilled, he refused to help Sadashiv.

Filmography

References

External links

 
 

1960 births
Living people
Indian male film actors
Male actors from Delhi
People from Delhi
Indian male television actors
Indian male stage actors
Indian male screenwriters
Delhi University alumni
Male actors in Hindi cinema
Film directors from Delhi